L'école buissonnière (English: Skip School 
and School of Life, Russian: 'Как прогулять школу с пользой') is a 2017 French comedy-drama film directed by Nicolas Vanier.

Plot 

Alongside Totoche, Paul will make a school out of life, out of nature's secrets, and learn to clean fish and everything there is to know about game, mushrooms, and plants.

1927. Paul, a boy orphaned during the WWI, comes to the Count of Fresnaye's estate to live with a foster family: Célestine, a maid at the manor, and her husband Borel, the gamekeeper. Left mostly to himself, and warned against showing up at the castle, because the Count doesn't tolerate children, Paul begins to explore the surrounding wilderness. He becomes friend with Totoche, a notorious poacher, who teaches him woodcraft. Borel is obsessed with catching Totoche, and Paul becomes mingled in the complicated relationship between Totoche, Borel and Célestine. Paul begins to suspect that his parents' connection to the locality is deeper than he was told. Meanwhile, Paul makes acquaintance with the Count, who warms up to the boy as he sees his interest in the outdoors. As they examine the Count's red deer trophy collection, the boy mentions he saw a deer with even bigger antlers in the Count's woods. In the course of the hunt after the deer the Count suffers a bad fall from a horse. The estate is about to pass to the Count's no-good son, a blatant egoist with property development ideas that would ruin the environment. But a dark family secret turns out to be a blessing.

Cast 

  as Paul
 François Cluzet as Totoche
 Éric Elmosnino as Borel
 Valérie Karsenti as Célestine
 François Berléand as Count of Fresnaye
 Urbain Cancelier as Lucien

Production
Filming for the movie began on 19 September 2016 in Sologne, Chambord, Loir-et-Cher, Beaugency and La Ferté-Saint-Cyr and wrapped up on 25 November in the same year.

References

External links

2017 films
2010s coming-of-age comedy-drama films
2010s French-language films
French coming-of-age comedy-drama films
Films about adoption
Films about orphans
Films directed by Nicolas Vanier
Films set in 1927
Films set in forests
2010s French films